The chestnut seedeater (Sporophila cinnamomea) is a species of bird in the family Thraupidae.
It is found in Argentina, Brazil, Paraguay, and Uruguay (where it can still be seen at the Quebrada de los Cuervos).

Its natural habitat is subtropical or tropical seasonally wet or flooded lowland grassland.
It is threatened by habitat loss.

References

chestnut seedeater
Birds of Argentina
Birds of Uruguay
chestnut seedeater
Taxonomy articles created by Polbot